Arno W. King (August 2, 1855 – July 21, 1918), of Ellsworth, Maine, was a justice of the Maine Supreme Judicial Court from June 28, 1907, to July 21, 1918.

Born in Lamoine, Maine, King graduated from Colby College in 1883, and from Boston University School of Law the same year. He was appointed an Associate Justice on June 28, 1907, and served until his death.

References

Justices of the Maine Supreme Judicial Court
1855 births
1918 deaths
Colby College alumni
Boston University School of Law alumni
People from Ellsworth, Maine
19th-century American judges